Sabaka (originally to be called Gunga Ram) is a 1953 American adventure film written, directed and co-produced by Frank Ferrin, filmed partially on location in India. The film also starred Victor Jory, Boris Karloff, Peter Coe, Reginald Denny, June Foray and Jay Novello.

The film was about the adventures of an Indian boy named Gunga Ram, played by Nino Marcel. (Ferrin also produced and directed the 1955 television show Andy's Gang, and a number of Gunga Ram's Indian adventures were later broadcast on Andy's show as short subjects. "Gunga Ram" actor Nino Marcel actually appeared live on the show with Andy Devine on two occasions.)

In February, 1953, immediately following the completion of Abbott and Costello Meet Dr. Jekyll and Mr. Hyde, it was announced that Boris Karloff would return to England to star in a Jules Verne movie, but the project was cancelled and Karloff was signed for Sabaka instead. Most of Sabaka was shot in India, but Karloff's and Victor Jory's scenes were all shot in Hollywood.

The film was originally to be titled Gunga Ram, but RKO Pictures complained the title was too similar to their Gunga Din (1939). The picture was briefly renamed The Hindu for its May 15, 1953 premiere screening, and was later again changed to Sabaka just before its general release in February 1955.

Plot 
Set in India, Gunga Ram, a young Indian boy, swears vengeance on the members of a religious death cult that murdered his sister Indria and her husband. The killings were ordered by the High Priestess of Sabaka (June Foray) and Ashok (Victor Jory). The Maharajah of Bakore disbelieves him, and when he turns to the Maharajah's General Pollegar (Boris Karloff), he is once again denied justice. Gunga Ram sets out with his two animal companions, a pet tiger and a trained elephant, to destroy the evil cult of Sabaka's fire shrine.

Cast 
Nino Marcel as Gunga Ram
Boris Karloff as General Pollegar
Lou Krugman as the Maharajah of Bakore
Reginald Denny as Sir Cedric
June Foray as Marku Ponjoy, High Priestess of Sabaka
Victor Jory as Ashok
Jay Novello as Damji
Lisa Howard as Indria
Peter Coe as Taru
Paul Marion as Kumar
Vito Scotti as Rama
Louis Merrill as Koobah
Jeanne Bates as Durga
K. K. Sinha as Fire Dancer

Taglines 
 You'll Never Forget the Thundering Feet of 150 Elephants! The Wild-Eyed Terror of a Mad Buffalo Stampede!
 SEE Barefoot Fire-dancers walk thru bed of live coals!
 SEE Nini Marcel, newest screen sensation, fight fear, force and the fire demon!
 India's mightiest dramatic pageant!

Notes

External links 

 
 

1954 films
1954 adventure films
Films set in India
Films shot in India
United Artists films
American adventure films
1950s English-language films
1950s American films